Century Dental College, Poinachi is a professional college of Kasaragod in India. It is accredited by the Dental Council of India.

History
The college was established in 2003 and got affiliated to Kannur University

Courses offered
 B.D.S. 100 seats

References

Colleges affiliated to Kannur University
Colleges in Kasaragod district
Dental colleges in India